Heaven Help Us is an American fantasy-comedy-drama television series that aired from August 25 until December 3, 1994. It was part of a syndicated package of shows called the Spelling Premiere Network.

Premise
Newlywed couple Doug and Lexy Monroe (John Schneider and Melinda Clarke) die in a plane crash and appear in a hotel room where an angel, Mr. Shepard (Ricardo Montalbán), explains that because of a mix-up they have to return to Earth and help people if they wish to earn a place in heaven.

Cast

Main
John Schneider as Doug Monroe
Melinda Clarke as Lexy Monroe
Ricardo Montalbán as Mr. Shepherd

Notable guests
 Terence Knox as Police Sgt Jeff Paris
 Marina Sirtis as Carolyn Paris
 Tom Bosley as Albert
 Peter DeLuise as Stumpy
 Nicole Eggert as Natalie
 Soleil Moon Frye as Louisa
 Eric Lutes as Jeff Barnett
 Efrem Zimbalist Jr. as Martin Kitteridge

Episodes

References

External links

1994 American television series debuts
1994 American television series endings
1990s American comedy-drama television series
English-language television shows
First-run syndicated television programs in the United States
Television series by Spelling Television
Television series by CBS Studios
Television shows set in Texas
Angels in television